Kugsak-45 is a sports club from Greenland based in Qasigiannguit. They compete in the Coca Cola GM.

Achievements 
Coca Cola GM: 2
Champion : 1995, 2002

External links
 Greenland Football Association Official website
 The Remotest Football website

Football clubs in Greenland
Association football clubs established in 1945
1945 establishments in Greenland